The Accra Sport Stadium disaster occurred at the Ohene Djan Stadium, Accra, Ghana on May 9, 2001. It took the lives of 126 people, making it the worst stadium disaster to have ever taken place in Africa. It is also the third-deadliest disaster in the history of association football behind the Estadio Nacional disaster and Kanjuruhan Stadium disaster.

Event 
Ghana's two most successful football teams played that day, Accra Hearts of Oak and Asante Kotoko. Officials were anticipating crowd disturbances, and had taken extra security measures. Accra scored two late goals, and a referee called 2–1 Accra, resulting in disappointed Kotoko fans throwing plastic seats and bottles onto the pitch.

The police responded by firing tear gas into the crowd. Panic and a stampede ensued as fans tried to escape. Gates were locked and the stadium's compromised design left a bottleneck, with fewer exits than originally planned. Ghana Institute of Architects called the stadium a "death trap." After the hour-long ordeal, it was found that 116 deaths resulted from compressive asphyxia and 10 fans died from trauma.

A fan, Abdul Mohammed, had passed out from the tear gas and was moved to a morgue, thought to be dead. He regained consciousness after someone stepped on his foot, narrowly missing being buried alive.

Reports claim that medical staff had already left the stadium, as the incident happened near the end of the match. Some gates were locked, preventing escape.

In an interview with the BBC News, the deputy Minister of Youth and Sports, Joe Aggrey, described the event as a devastating one with piles of bodies on the floors of the stadium.

Aftermath
An official inquiry blamed police for over-reacting with reckless behaviour and indiscriminate firing of plastic bullets and tear gas. It also accused some officers of dishonesty and indefensible laxity. Six police officers were charged with 127 counts of manslaughter. The court ruled that the prosecution had failed to make a case and that the asphyxia may have been caused by the stampede and not the tear gas.

The commission of inquiry recommended improvements to stadium security and first aid facilities, and that nationwide rapid response teams should be set up.

Accra Sports Stadium was renovated in 2007 according to FIFA standards. Politics may have deferred the National Sports Council's attention to the stadium and it was again in disrepair 15 years after the disaster.

Memorial 
Following the event Ghana's president, John Agyekum Kufuor, called for three days of mourning. The Ghana Premier Football League suspended play for a month. Since 2001 corporations and philanthropists, including Herbert Mensah, who was Asante Kotoko chairman from 1999 to 2003, have memorialized this tragedy with the Stadium Disaster Fund and a series of events in Kumasi.

The events include paying respects to families of victims and their 148 children, their invitation to the Otumfuo's birthday at Manhyia Palace, prayers in the local Central Mosque, donations to the needy, the laying of a memorial wreath and a memorial march called the "May 9th Remembered Street Walk." In 2016 an annual memorial "May 9th Cup" football competition was created. Mensah has appealed to the government to memorialize that May 9, to no agreement. In 2017 the memorial events were themed "Embrace the Day."

A bronze statue was erected outside the stadium of a fan carrying another fan to safety with the inscription title "I Am My Brother's Keeper" in honor of the victims of the tragedy.

Fans who attend matches at the stadium now chant "Never Again! Never Again!" to remind themselves of the day.

Similar events
 Heysel Stadium disaster
 Hillsborough disaster
 2015 Accra explosion
 2022 Kanjuruhan Stadium disaster

References

External links 
 Crowd Dynamics report

Stadium disasters
Human stampedes in 2001
Football in Ghana
Sport in Accra
Man-made disasters in Ghana
2001 in Ghana
2001 in African football
Police misconduct in Ghana
21st century in Accra
Accra Hearts of Oak S.C.
Asante Kotoko S.C.
May 2001 events in Africa
Association football controversies
2001 disasters in Ghana